Bimbache or Bimbape is the name given to the inhabitants of El Hierro, who inhabited the island before the Spanish conquest of the Canary Islands that took place between 1402 and 1496. The Bimbache are one of several peoples native to the Canaries, with a genetic and cultural link to the Berber people of North Africa. The Bimbache people shared a common link with other aboriginal peoples of the Canary Islands.

The island of El Hierro was known to the Bimbache as Eseró or Heró. The word "Bimbache" means "Sons of the Sons of Tenerife", so were believed to be descendants of the Guanches, the ancient inhabitants of the island of Tenerife.

Division of aboriginal territory 

Unlike the other Canary Islands, El Hierro had no internal territorial divisions.

The Spanish conquest and the Bimbache 

The Spanish conquest was carried out in late 1405 by Jean de Béthencourt, who promised to respect the freedom of the Bimbache, and there was no resistance from the small aboriginal population. This promise was broken by de Béthencourt's son, who sold most of the Bimbache inhabitants as slaves, and the island was repopulated with Spanish and Norman settlers.

Before the arrival of the Castilian and Aragonese crown forces, the population was largely pastoral, raising cattle, goats, sheep and pigs, alongside the cultivation of grain and maritime resources. As there were no merchant trade routes servicing the island, the vessels that brought the inhabitants to the island were destroyed with time, and left a domestic market whose trading system was based on the exchange of local produce. Land and other common resources were managed and distributed equally by collective agreements held during meetings chaired by a mediating king, using a system of participatory democracy where the king was a figure of justice and democratic mediation.

Bimbache mythology 
Each island of the Canaries had its own gods, distinct to each island, though the islands shared common concepts in their mythology, such as divine power represented by Nature. The two benign deities in El Hierro were the god Eraorahan and the goddess Moneiba, with a third malevolent god, Aranfaybo, who was prayed to in times of desperation.

The gradual expansion of control by the Crown of Castile and Aragon delegated benefits of both land and commercial production rights to a minority by means of a feudal regime. Additionally, the native religion's symbols of nature were suppressed in order to introduce Christianity to the island. Both before and after the incorporation of El Hierro to the Spanish crown, some population of working age were taken from the island to Castile for slave labour, before later regaining the status of human beings, and being returned to the island. Later, the island was also populated by people of French and Galician origin, also under a feudal system by the Crowns of Castile and Aragon.

Genetics

 examined the remains of a large number of Bimbache buried at Punta Azul, El Hierro c. 1015-1200 AD. The 16 samples of Y-DNA extracted belonged to the paternal haplogroups  E1a (1 sample), E1b1b1a1 (7 samples) and R1b1a2 (7 samples). All the extracted samples of mtDNA belonged to the maternal haplogroup H1-1626. E1a is most common in sub-Saharan Africa, while E1b1b1a1 is very common in North Africa. R1b1a2 is considered a typical European lineage, but is also found at low frequencies in North Africa. About 10% of examined Guanches of Gran Canaria have been found to be carriers of R1b1a2. The dominance of a single maternal lineage (H1-1626) suggested that the Bimbache were a matrilineal society. The authors of the study suggested that the Bimbache were descended from the earliest of two or more migration waves from North Africa to the Canary Islands.

See also 
 El Hierro
 Guanches
 Garoé
 Conquest of the Canary Islands
 Berber people

References

Sources

External links

Guanches
Museums of Tenerife.

Ancient peoples
Indigenous peoples of North Africa
Berber peoples and tribes
History of the Canary Islands
Guanche
El Hierro